Enacrosoma is a genus of orb-weaver spiders first described by Cândido Firmino de Mello-Leitão in 1932.

Species
 it contains six species found from Mexico to Brazil:
Enacrosoma anomalum (Taczanowski, 1873) – Colombia, Peru to Brazil, French Guiana
Enacrosoma decemtuberculatum (O. Pickard-Cambridge, 1890) – Guatemala
Enacrosoma frenca Levi, 1996 – Mexico to Panama
Enacrosoma javium Levi, 1996 – Costa Rica, Panama
Enacrosoma multilobatum (Simon, 1897) – Peru
Enacrosoma quizarra Levi, 1996 – Costa Rica

References

Araneidae
Araneomorphae genera
Spiders of Central America
Spiders of Mexico
Spiders of South America
Taxa named by Cândido Firmino de Mello-Leitão